Guicang (歸藏, "Return to the Hidden") is a divination text dating to the Zhou dynasty, which was once used in place of the I Ching. The text of Guicang was rediscovered in a rural bog in 1993; it had been lost for roughly two thousand years.

Guicang contains the sixty-four hexagrams and stories relating to each of them. For example, Hexagram 54 of the I Ching, "Returning Maiden", is accompanied by the story of how the maiden Chang'e stole the medicine of immortality from Xi Wangmu and, upon returning home, used the hexagrams to determine that she should flee to the moon.

Footnotes

I Ching
Taoist texts
Confucian texts
Chinese classic texts
Chinese books of divination
Chinese folk religion